SB Wyvenhoe is an 83-ton, steel Thames sailing barge. She was built by Forrest & Sons, Wivenhoe in 1898.
She has the Official No. 110012.

History
She traded under sail until 1923 when she converted to a motor ship. She was rebuilt in steel in 1947, she continued to trade until 1982. She holds the record of having traded longer than any other British registered ship.
She was owned in trade by London and Rochester Trading Company (LRTC) then rerigged as company yacht barge by Richard Walsh in 1986. She is now owned by Trad Sail Charters and based in Maldon.

See also
 SB Kathleen

References

Sources

External links

Wyvenhoe
1898 ships
Individual sailing vessels
Ships built in Colchester
Transport on the River Thames
Sailing ships of the United Kingdom
Ships and vessels on the National Register of Historic Vessels